School No. 7 is a historic school building located at Dunkirk in Chautauqua County, New York. It is significant as a one-story school building of the early 20th century. It was designed about 1916-1919 and built about 1920–1921.

It was listed on the National Register of Historic Places in 1992 by the efforts of the neighborhood in which the school resides and against the better judgement of the rest of the city that would have liked the location return to private residences or businesses. The location in question is about 0.4 miles from a public beach along Lake Erie and an ideal location for beach front restaurants and other entertainment venues.

References

School buildings on the National Register of Historic Places in New York (state)
School buildings completed in 1920
Buildings and structures in Chautauqua County, New York
National Register of Historic Places in Chautauqua County, New York